New Harbor is a small scenic coastal village in the town of Bristol, in Lincoln County, Maine, United States. In 2019, the town of Bristol, and in-turn New Harbor was a finalist in the Reader's Digest award for "America's Nicest Place." Bristol and New Harbor were also nominated for and won the "Nicest Place in Maine Award" by Reader's Digest. New Harbor has historical sites such as the Pemaquid Point Lighthouse and Fort William Henry. New Harbor is the site of Pemaquid Beach, on Johns Bay.

Beach history 
Pemaquid Beach, is a public family beach in New Harbor, Maine. The Beach is owned by the Town of Bristol in mid-coast Maine and, along with its "sister" park- the Pemaquid Point Lighthouse, are operated by the Bristol Parks Commission.

In 1958 there was a special town meeting held where voters of New Harbor approved a large purchase of what was once called "Big Beach." This town purchase officially made the beach public, allowing all residents to visit any time of the year even when closed in the off-season.

Notable residents
Benjamin Bates IV
Slaid Cleaves
Thomas Drummond (judge)
John Gyles
Marcus Hanna (lighthouse keeper)
Robert Livingston Ireland Jr.
Cabot Lyford, sculptor
William North
Elizabeth Upham Yates

Representations in media
The village's lobster fishermen and "Back Cove" were featured on an episode of the Discovery Channel's Sunrise Earth. The community was also used as a filming location for the 1999 film Message in a Bottle, with some scenes filmed at Shaw's Wharf. In 1922 the silent film The Seventh Day, starring Richard Barthelmess, was filmed in New Harbor.

Hiking and nature preserves include the Rachel Carson Salt Pond Preserve in New Harbor. The Salt Pond Preserve was one of Carson's favorite spots, and inspired some of the research for her book, The Edge of the Sea.

Gallery

References

Villages in Maine
Villages in Lincoln County, Maine
Populated coastal places in Maine